Paro simoni is a species of Spanish dwarf spiders. It is the only species in the monotypic genus Paro. The species and genus were first described by Lucien Berland in 1942, and has only been found on the Austral Islands. Originally placed with the Agelenidae, it was moved to the sheet weavers in 1967.

See also
 List of Linyphiidae species (I–P)

References

Linyphiidae
Spiders described in 1942
Spiders of Oceania
Taxa named by Lucien Berland